This is a list of the National Register of Historic Places listings in Birmingham, Alabama.

This is intended to be a complete list of the properties and districts on the National Register of Historic Places in Birmingham, Alabama, United States. Latitude and longitude coordinates are provided for many National Register properties and districts; these locations may be seen together in an online map.

There are 171 properties and districts listed on the National Register in Jefferson County, including 3 National Historic Landmarks. 146 of these sites, including all of the National Historic Landmarks, are located in Birmingham, and are listed here, while 26 sites are listed separately. One district, the Red Mountain Suburbs Historic District, includes contributing properties located in the city of Birmingham and in adjacent parts of Jefferson County.

Current listings

|}

See also

 List of National Historic Landmarks in Alabama
 National Register of Historic Places listings in Alabama

References

 
Birmingham
Birhingham, Alabama